Weaverville may refer to a place in the United States:
 Weaverville, Arizona
 Weaverville, California
 Weaverville, North Carolina